The seventh edition of the Copa América de Ciclismo was held on 7 January 2007 in São Paulo, Brazil.

Results

References 
 "7th Copa America de Ciclismo - 1.2", Cycling News

Copa América de Ciclismo
Copa
Copa
January 2007 sports events in South America